The Albania–Serbia football rivalry, previously known as Albania–Yugoslavia football rivalry is a sports rivalry that exists between the national football teams of the two countries, as well as their respective sets of fans. The rivalry is considered to be one of the most bitter in the world owing to the events that took place relatively recently during the Kosovo war. Tense relations between the two nations are thus fueled by political and historical differences.

The teams have had only two matches, with both Albania and Serbia having one win. The first match took place between the two respective nations on 14 October 2014, which was awarded a 3–0 victory to Albania.

History

21st century

At the UEFA Euro 2016 qualification game, the first association football match between Albania and Serbia took place on 14 October 2014, at Partizan Stadium in Belgrade. At the beginning of the match, the Serbian crowd chanted "Ubij, ubij Šiptara" (Kill, kill the Albanian). Chants like “Kill the Serb," “Kill the Croat," and "Kill the Albanian” became part of the Balkan football folklore in stadiums across the region after nationalism rose after wars between the countries. Afterwards, a drone quadcopter carrying the map of Greater Albania appeared on the pitch. After Serbian player Mitrović tried to grab the flag, Albanian players attacked him. This led to a scuffle between the two sides. After the riot broke out, Branislav Ivanović said that the players shielded the Albanian players while they were going back to the tunnel. The match was abandoned at 0–0 after the fans invaded the pitch. FIFA's president condemned the behavior and punished both football associations. 

On 10 July 2015, the Court of Arbitration for Sport (CAS), awarded a 3–0 victory to Albania. On 8 October 2015, the second match between the nations took place at the Elbasan Arena in Albania. The Serbian football team's bus was attacked by Albanian protesters with stones. A few hours before the kickoff, the Albanian police carried out riots, firing water cannon bursts as a helicopter buzzed over nearby buildings. The match ended with Serbia defeating Albania by 2–0 score. The second match was mostly free of tensions because heavy security and other measures were imposed to guard against incidents. The only sign of the intense rivalry was the loud booing by Albanian fans during the Serbian national anthem.  Since this match, Albania and Serbia have not played a football game due to tensions.

Overall and matches

Overall

Matches

References

International association football rivalries
football
Albania national football team rivalries
Serbia national football team rivalries